During the 1909–10 English football season, Brentford competed in the Southern League First Division. A mid-table season ended on a positive note, with a run of just three defeats from the final 17 matches.

Season summary 

Brentford manager Fred Halliday assembled a small squad for the 1909–10 season, with the club having withdrawn from the Western League and United League in favour of concentrating solely on the Southern League. A handful of the previous season's squad was retained and in came a number of new players, including goalkeeper Archie Ling and former Brentford pair Jock Hamilton and Adam Bowman. The club adopted new colours prior to the season, with the gold and blue-striped shirts being replaced by a gold shirt with a blue 'V' on the front and back.

Injury to captain Dusty Rhodes, illness suffered by Jock Hamilton and poor form from forward George Rushton contributed to Brentford's bad start to the First Division season. Manager Halliday was forced to play natural centre forward Adam Bowman at inside forward, which conflicted with centre forward Geordie Reid's role and necessitated the transfer swap of Bowman for Portsmouth inside forward Bill McCafferty in October 1909. After exiting the FA Cup in the second round at the hands of Accrington Stanley, Brentford emerged from a poor Christmas and January to win 10 and draw four of the final 17 matches of the season. The Bees finished comfortably in 14th position.

League table

Results
Brentford's goal tally listed first.

Legend

Southern League First Division

FA Cup 

 Source: 100 Years of Brentford

Playing squad

Left club during season

 Source: 100 Years of Brentford,

Coaching staff

Statistics

Appearances

Goalscorers 

Players listed in italics left the club mid-season.
Source: 100 Years Of Brentford

Management

Summary

References 

Brentford F.C. seasons
Brentford